Diosdado G. Alesna (born May 18, 1909, date of death unknown) was a Filipino Cebuano and Visayan writer. 

His recognized pen names included Diody Mangloy, Rigor Tancredo, Reynaldo Lap, Buntia, La Roca, Melendres, and Flordeliz Makaluluoy.

Early life
Alesna was born in Carcar, Cebu in May 1909. He was an educator and a civil servant. He created the Cebuano verse form "siniloy" and frequently won prizes, including the 1966 award for "Most Outstanding Poet for the Last 10 Years" from Lubas sa Dagang Bisaya (LUDABI), an organisation which is the self-declared 'official' source for Cebuano Visayan.

Poems
 Ang Gahom sa Awit (The Power of Song)
 Kalimti ug Biyai (Forget and Leave)
 Si Kristo sa Balabag (Christ on the Cross)

References

External links
www.bisaya.com Visayan Literature page

1909 births
Year of death missing
Cebuano people
Cebuano writers
Filipino writers
Visayan writers